Frequency specific microcurrent or frequency specific microcurrent therapy (FSMT) is the practice of introducing a mild electrical current into an area of damaged soft tissue. Practitioners claim that the introduced current enhances the healing process underway in that same tissue. Critics, such as David Gorski, call proponent's claims of the technique altering body tissue's vibrational amplitude pseudoscience.

About 

Frequency Specific Microcurrent (FSM) uses specific frequencies and was utilized by thousands of medical physicians between 1910 and 1935. As a result of the 1910 Flexner Report, medical training began to closely adhere to the scientific method and become grounded in human physiology and biochemistry. As such, FSM devices ended up in the back rooms of clinics all over the US and Canada.

Frequencies are simultaneously applied used on two channels so they intersect or cross in the area to be treated. Clinical experience shows that both frequencies need to accurately reflect the condition causing the problem (like inflammation or scarring) and the tissue being affected (like the nerve or spinal cord) in order for the treatment to be successful.

FDA classification  

All class II microcurrent devices are allowed to be marketed to physicians in the United States if they have applied for and obtained a 510(k) clearance through the FDA. The certificate means it can be used in a medical setting and is substantially equivalent to other devices. FDA has approved all microcurrent devices for sale in the category of TENS devices. 510(k) clearances for specific devices can be found on the FDA's website.

From the Federal Food, Drug, and Cosmetic Act page 

A 2011 study by Diana Zuckerman and Paul Brown of the National Research Center for Women and Families, and Dr. Steven Nissen of the Cleveland Clinic, published in the Archives of Internal Medicine, showed that most medical devices recalled in the last five years for "serious health problems or death" had been previously cleared by the FDA using the less stringent, and cheaper, 510(k) process. In a few cases the devices had been deemed so low-risk that they did not need FDA regulation. Of the 113 devices recalled, 35 were for cardiovascular issues. This may lead to a reevaluation of FDA procedures and better oversight.

History 

In 1946, an osteopath named Harry Van Gelder bought a practice in Vancouver BC and found a machine in the back room that was made in 1922. Accompanying it were a list of frequencies. Van Gelder learned how to use the machine and combined it with other therapies to treat patients successfully . Dr. Carolyn McMakin discovered Van Gelder's list in 1995 and began to use a two-channel microcurrent machine to deliver the frequencies.

McMakin has the earliest published papers on the topic:

In 1998 "Microcurrent treatment of myofascial pain in the head neck and face". She claimed significant improvement for the 50 patients in the sample. In the paper McMakin notes limitations included in the study:
A neither average nor random sample.
No systematic control group or placebo condition.
Patients, physicians, and third-party expected positive outcomes.
FSM was not the only treatment given to the patients.

In 2004 "Microcurrent therapy: a novel treatment for chronic low back myofascial pain". She claimed significant, immediate, and substantial results for the 22 patients in the sample. In the paper McMakin notes that the results should be analyzed with caution and that limitations are included in the study:
Patients were not derived from a randomized group.
The sample was refractory to other treatments and conditioned to expect positive outcomes.
There was no control or placebo group.
Other treatments were inconsistently used on the patients at the same time

Usage 

A 2009 narrative review of literature specific to applications for physical therapy recommends that the clinical evidence is strong enough to include the therapy in a clinician's repertoire. However, the authors advise caution due to what they call a "frustrating lack" of human trial evidence for the technique.

A 2012 systematic review of physical therapies for Achilles tendinopathy found limited evidence from a single randomized clinical trial suggests FSM as an effective therapy. 

There is a textbook available for those who wish to learn how to use FSM to treat pain conditions. Frequency Specific Microcurrent in Pain Management is published by Elsevier Press.

Criticism 

Skeptics note that FSM is another form of vibration medicine and that there is no good evidence that when a tissue is injured it takes on a “different vibrational characteristic”. In addition to the implausibility of the underlying mechanism, critics further argue that the treatment lacks a body or research neither establishing the phenomenon nor the clinical claims. 

A 1994 review of electronic devices as potential cancer treatments by the American Cancer Society found the methods to questionable, ineffective, and strongly advises against using them.

Another criticism is that the champion of the modality is a discredited chiropractor.

References 

Alternative medicine
Bioelectromagnetic-based therapies
Pseudoscience